Kumukunsi is a traditional Filipino deep-fried doughnut originating from the Maguindanao people. It is made from rice flour, duck eggs, and sugar. It is traditionally fried into spiral shapes. It has a creamy flavor, similar to pancakes.

See also
Binangkal
Lokot-lokot
Panyalam
Shakoy

References 

Doughnuts
Philippine snack food